The Atomic Skull is a supervillain in American comic books published by DC Comics, commonly as an enemy of Superman. The character first appeared in 1978.

Publication history
The Albert Michaels version of the Atomic Skull first appeared in Superman #323 (May 1978) and was created by Martin Pasko and Curt Swan.

The Joseph Martin version of the Atomic Skull first appeared in The Adventures of Superman #483 and was created by Roger Stern and Bob McLeod.

Fictional character biography

Albert Michaels
Albert Michaels was a brilliant, but genuinely unfriendly scientist-administrator at S.T.A.R. Labs with a rare nervous system disorder that short-circuited the electrical impulses in his brain, creating painful and uncontrollable seizures. When he could not find a cure, he secretly contacted the criminal organization SKULL, and they implanted him with a radium-powered device designed to harness his neural disorder into deadly atomic "brain-blasts" in exchange for him becoming their agent. However, these mental blasts were difficult to control and only made his condition worse, a situation that he blamed on Superman after the Man of Steel captured the only SKULL scientists who could have cured him. Swearing revenge, the evil genius donned his distinctive yellow and green costume with its visored, cowl-topped skull mask, called himself the Atomic Skull, and eventually became the organization's leader, flying around in a sleek skull-shaped hovercraft of his own design and assisted by his similarly costumed lover Felicia, who was a panther that he had artificially evolved into human form.

Following Crisis on Infinite Earths, Michaels made one appearance, battling Thunder and Lightning in Teen Titans Spotlight. It is assumed that his background has not changed, although instead of being diagnosed with a nervous disorder, it was said that his powers came because he sought immortality and presumably mutated himself. It is not known if he ever fought the Post-Crisis version of Superman before, as his first (Post-Crisis) appearance was in Captain Atom, yet his history with S.T.A.R. Labs and SKULL remained as established in The DC Comics Encyclopedia.

Michaels returned in 2007 in Birds of Prey. He also appeared in the miniseries Villains United, where he joined Luthor's Society.

Joseph Martin

Student Joseph Martin was at S.T.A.R. Labs for a routine check-up when it was struck by an intense blast of energy from the Dominators' gene-bomb that gave him superhuman strength and caused his flesh to become invisible. Later attacked by some thugs, the resulting brain damage caused insanity, and he took on the guise of "the Atomic Skull" who was a hero from an old movie serial that he loved. He also emitted dangerous amounts of radiation, later gaining the ability to project it as energy blasts. He has plagued Superman, whom he believed to be the serial's villain Doctor Electron (particularly when Superman had currently acquired electricity-based powers), and Lois Lane, whom he saw as the Skull's love interest, Zelda Wentworth.

He was later given enhanced powers by the demon Neron in exchange for his soul. Cured of his delusions, he at first intended to follow the character's example for real as a superhero, but has since appeared as a more conventional supervillain.

He is killed in battle by the Maximums, an alternate reality superhero team, but is later seen alive in the pages of Action Comics, assuming that Mr. Mxyzptlk reversed his death, along with other events having to do with the Maximums.

Recently, Martin crashed a movie premiere in Hollywood, having become obsessed with an actress who was in the film. He was defeated by Manhunter.

Martin was among the villains in the ambush of the JSA led by the Tapeworm.

While Superman is off-world, Martin attempts to cause trouble in downtown Metropolis, but is defeated by Mon-El.

The New 52
In The New 52 reboot launched in 2011, the Joseph Martin version of the Atomic Skull is re-introduced in Action Comics vol. 2 Annual #1, penned by Chronicle writer Max Landis.

When a S.T.A.R. Labs submarine crashes far below the surface of the ocean, one of its scientists is exposed to experimental radiation. He is washed to shore, with memories of the life he had, and the woman he loved and lost. Alone on a desert island, he fights to survive, eating the local, tropical vegetation. When a leopard finds and attacks him, he unexpectedly emits a blast of radiation that vaporizes the big cat's body. Eventually, he learns to use this power to his benefit, killing animals for food, and blasting away holes in the rock faces for shelter. The radiation soon takes its toll on him, as he remembers how he had caught his wife flirting with someone at a dance club and murdered her in a jealous rage. In anger, he destroys most of the island. His face, meanwhile, practically melts away, revealing his radioactive skull.

DC Rebirth
In June 2016, DC Comics relaunched its entire line of comic book titles with DC Rebirth. The Atomic Skull is seen imprisoned in Kamen Maximum Security Prison in Superwoman #1.

In Hal Jordan and the Green Lantern Corps #45, the Atomic Skull is shown trying to make amends by being the warden at Stryker's Island Penitentiary. When Hal Jordan tried to break out Hector Hammond, the Atomic Skull fought him, but before he could do anything else, Hector Hammond renders him temporarily brain dead using his psychic powers and Hal Jordan convinces him to let the Atomic Skull live.

Powers and abilities
Albert Michaels can deliver powerful energy bolts through the visor of his mask. These blasts have been described as unique brainwaves, heat vision, and radioactive energy throughout the years. Beside from his energy attacks, Michaels is an experienced leader of the SKULL organization and a brilliant scientist.

Joseph Martin has immense strength, stamina, and durability, comparable to that of Superboy (Kon-El), Superman, and Lar Gand. He can also project blasts of purple atomic energy from his hands or mouth for long-range attacks and use the same one to power himself up in a higher degree.

Other versions

Movie serial
The Atomic Skull is the name of Joseph Martin's favorite hero from a (fictional) 12-episode movie serial made by National Film Studios in 1936. The serial stars Lawrence Dennis (according to Superman Villains Secret Files and Origins #1) as the titular character. This Atomic Skull was originally government agent Joe Martin who investigated the evil Doctor Electron and was transformed into the hideous Atomic Skull by one of Electron's inventions. Despite this, he and Zelda Wentworth, Electron's daughter (played by actress Eleanor Hart, whom Lois Lane has a passing resemblance to), fell in love. Battling Electron and his minions (such as Rocketman) with his heat ray eye-blasts, the Atomic Skull eventually destroyed the mad scientist's plans and returned to normal. The fictional character from the serial is visually identical to Albert Michaels, the Pre-Crisis version of the Atomic Skull.

Dominus' reality
In a story featuring the reality-altering villain Dominus recreating various Pre-Crisis Superman continuities, the supposed Golden Age Atomic Skull was first introduced. He was Lawrence Dennis, an actor and Nazi sympathizer who used his reputation as the hero of the serial Curse of the Atomic Skull as a platform to promote Nazism.

Superman: Red Son
The Atomic Skull is featured in the alternate reality Superman: Red Son as one of Lex Luthor's experiments.

Flashpoint
In the alternate timeline of the Flashpoint event, a version of the Atomic Skull is imprisoned in the military Doom prison and is working to keep the other prisoners in, as he recognizes that he is a bigger fish in jail than he would ever be in the real world.

In other media

Television
 Albert Michaels makes a non-speaking appearance in the Superman episode "Fugitive from Space" as a S.T.A.R. Labs scientist.
 The Joseph Martin incarnation of the Atomic Skull appears in Justice League Unlimited, voiced by Lex Lang. Following a minor appearance in the episode "The Cat and the Canary" as a participant in Roulette's Meta-Brawl, he joins Gorilla Grodd's Secret Society as of the episode "I Am Legion". Prior to and during the episodes "Alive!" and "Destroyer", Lex Luthor takes command of the Society, but Grodd mounts a mutiny. Atomic Skull sides with the former before Darkseid attacks and kills most of the Society, though Luthor, Atomic Skull, and the survivors join forces with the Justice League to repel Darkseid's invasion of Earth.
 The Albert Michaels incarnation of the Atomic Skull appears in the Young Justice episode "Revelation" as a member of the Injustice League.
 The Albert Michaels incarnation of the Atomic Skull appears in the opening credits of Powerless.
 A hologram sparring program of Atomic Skull appeared in the Superman & Lois episode Closer. Other holo sparring programs were of Titano and Mechano-Man.

Film
 The Joseph Martin incarnation of the Atomic Skull appears in Superman vs. The Elite, voiced by Dee Bradley Baker. Following a fight with Superman, he is incarcerated at and forced to power Stryker's Island until he escapes by overloading the generator. He then goes on a rampage until he is confronted and defeated by Superman and the Elite before the group's leader Manchester Black kills him at the behest of a boy whose father the Atomic Skull killed.
 An unidentified Atomic Skull makes a cameo appearance in Justice League vs. Teen Titans, voiced by an uncredited Rick D. Wasserman.

Video games 
The Joseph Martin incarnation of the Atomic Skull appears as a summonable character in Scribblenauts Unmasked: A DC Comics Adventure.

Miscellaneous
The Albert Michaels incarnation of the Atomic Skull appears in a special one-shot for the Young Justice tie-in comic book published for Free Comic Book Day.

See also
List of Superman enemies

References

Articles about multiple fictional characters
Characters created by Curt Swan
Characters created by Gerry Conway
Characters created by Roger Stern
Comics characters introduced in 1976
Comics characters introduced in 1991
DC Comics characters with superhuman strength
DC Comics male supervillains
DC Comics metahumans
DC Comics scientists
Fictional biologists
Fictional characters who have made pacts with devils
Fictional characters with death or rebirth abilities
Fictional characters with energy-manipulation abilities
Fictional characters with nuclear or radiation abilities
Fictional characters with superhuman durability or invulnerability
Fictional inventors
Fictional mad scientists
Fictional skeletons
Superman characters

de:Schurken im Superman-Universum#Atomic Skull